Nom de Guerre Cabal is the thirty-seventh studio album by Omar Rodríguez-López as a solo artist, released on 2 December 2016. It is his eleventh release in the 12 album series initiated by Ipecac Recordings.

Similar to the preceding album Zapopan, Nom de Guerre Cabal features new mixes of previously released songs, this time with all songs having been included on ¿Sólo Extraño?, originally released March 8, 2013.

"Bitter Sunsets" was uploaded in advance as the album's single.

Track listing
All songs written by Omar Rodríguez-López, original titles from ¿Sólo Extraño? in parentheses.
 "Uncovering a Word" – 2:04 ("Salt Lines")
 "Bitter Sunsets" – 4:46 ("Invisible Lasiness")
 "Healed and Raised by Wounds" – 5:12 ("Turn For Caring")
 "Riot Squid" – 3:33 ("Horror (original)", aka "My Horror Is in Park, Drive Me Away Troubled Heart" from Dōitashimashite) 
 "Life Proves Its Worth" – 6:06 ("House in the Sand")
 "Victims of Power" – 3:21 ("Machu Picchu")
 "Violet Rays Again" – 6:12 ("Quemamos Lo")
 "Nom de Guerre" – 4:00 ("Common Condescend")
 "How Does One Love Go Blind" – 3:53 ("Discursos")

Personnel
Omar Rodríguez-López – vocals, synthesizers, sequences, guitar, bass, piano, samples, engineering
Deantoni Parks – drums (1-7,9)
Thomas Pridgen – drums (8)

Production
Chris Common – mixing, mastering

Release history

References

2016 albums
Omar Rodríguez-López albums
Ipecac Recordings albums
Albums produced by Omar Rodríguez-López